Genovese is an Italian surname meaning, properly, someone from Genoa. Its Italian plural form Genovesi has also developed into a surname.

People
 Alfred Genovese (1931–2011), American oboist
 Alfredo Genovese (born 1964), Argentine artist
 Anthony Vincent Genovese (born 1932), American architect 
 Bruna Genovese (born 1976), Italian long-distance runner
 Damián Genovese (born 1978), Venezuelan actor and model
 Domenico Genovese (born 1961), English footballer
 Elizabeth Fox-Genovese (1941–2007), American historian
 Eugene D. Genovese (born 1930), American historian
 Fabio Del Genovese (1902–1976), Italian wrestler
 Frank Genovese (1914–1981), American professional baseball player, manager and scout
 George Genovese (born 1930), American baseball player and scout
 Leo Genovese (born 1979), Argentine jazz pianist, keyboardist, and composer
 María Noel Genovese (born 1943), Uruguayan model and actress
 Michael Genovese (disambiguation), several people
 Mike Genovese (born 1942), American actor
 Pablo Genovese (born 1977), Argentine footballer
 Paolo Genovese (born 1966), Italian film director
 Richard Genovese (born 1947), American painter
 Rino Genovese (1905–1967), Italian film actor
 Vito Genovese (1897–1969), prominent New York City Mafia Boss 
 William Genovese, American computer criminal

Fictional characters
 Phillip Genovese, a character on the television series Crossing Lines

See also
 Murder of Kitty Genovese, widely publicized murder in New York City, 1964
 Genovese syndrome, or bystander effect, named for the Kitty Genovese case
 Genovese crime family, one of the "Five Families" of New York City's Mafia
 Genovese Drug Stores, a defunct pharmacy chain in the NYC area
 Genovese sauce, a meat sauce from Napoli
 Genoese (disambiguation)
 Genovesi

References

Italian-language surnames
Genoa
Italian toponymic surnames